Checea is a commune in Timiș County, Romania. It is composed of a single village, Checea, part of the commune of Cenei until 2004, when it was split off.

Geography 
Checea is located in the west of Timiș County, 37 km from Timișoara and 16 km from Jimbolia, the nearest town. It borders the commune of Cărpiniș to the north, the village of Bobda to the east, Serbia to the southwest and the commune of Uivar to the south.

Climate 
Checea's climate is classified as warm and temperate. The thermal regime is moderate, due to the oceanic and Mediterranean influences. In general, winters are mild and short; the first snow falls on average on 29 November, and the last until mid-March. The number of days with snow cover is on average less than 30 per year, due to the penetration of warm air from the south, and the thickness of the snow layer is reduced, around 5 cm. Summers are warmer and longer than other lowland areas. The coldest month of the year is January, with an average temperature of –1.5 °C. July is the warmest month of the year; the temperature in July averages 21.6 °C. The multiannual average precipitation reaches values of 570–600 mm. Most precipitation falls in summer (about 30%), followed by spring, autumn and winter (about 20%).

Flora and fauna 
The vegetation found here is specific to the forest-steppe. The area is devoid of forests, the species of scattered trees being typical of mixed foliage forests. The spontaneous grassy vegetation is restricted to pastures, obligatory hayfields and some salty lands. There are associations of plants made of ryegrass (Lolium perenne), dog's tooth grass (Cynodon dactylon), fescue (Festuca spp.), mugwort (Artemisia spp.), bird's-foot trefoil (Lotus corniculatus), dandelion (Taraxacum officinale), cypress spurge (Euphorbia cyparissias), white clover (Trifolium repens), and on the lands affected by salinization there are also characteristic species: statice (Limonium spp.), vipergrass (Scorzonera spp.), sea aster (Tripolium pannonicum), chamomile (Matricaria spp.), etc. In the portions of land with groundwater closer to the surface cock's-foot (Dactylis glomerata), meadow foxtail (Alopecurus pratensis), buttercups (Ranunculus spp.) are frequently found, and in the swampy micro-depressions and in the canal beds there are bulrushes (Typha latifolia), reeds (Phragmites australis), rushes (Juncus spp.), etc. The most common crop species are wheat, barley, corn, sunflower, soy, sugar beet, horseradish, lucerne, clover, hemp and a number of vegetables.

The fauna is of Central European type, with penetrations and a mixture of species coming from Northern, Southern and Eastern Europe:
 rodents: susliks, hamsters, mole rats, hares;
 large mammals: deers;
 carnivores: polecats, foxes, badgers;
 birds: larks, partridges, bustards, storks, starlings, pheasants, sparrowhawks;
 fish: carps, Prussian carps, bleaks, pikes, catfish.

History 
Today's village was formed by merging Checea Croată ("Croatian Checea") and Checea Română ("Romanian Checea"). Initially, there was only one settlement, attested in 1470 as Kewche, as the property of Blasiusz Szati's family, and later of the Desi brothers (Ladislau, Petru and Ioan). During the Turkish occupation it was inhabited by Romanians, but at the time of the conquest of Banat by the Austrians, it had only eight houses. After 1717, a large part of its territory was under the rule of the Catholic diocese of Zagreb, and the rest of the Austrian state in the form of titula precaria, a form of feudal servitude that lasted until the 1890s. Checea was practically re-established in 1738 and had a mixed Romanian-Serbian character.

The construction of the Orthodox church in 1772 gave rise to many dissensions between Romanians and Serbs. Therefore, the village of Checea Croată was established in 1802 on the outskirts of the old settlement, which from then on will be called Checea Română. Croatian families began to settle in the newly established Checea Croată, on the estates of an agricultural owner. The two villages will remain separated for more than a century. Immediately after the union of Banat with Romania, the border area will be disputed by Romania and Yugoslavia. In 1919, Checea Croată was transferred to Yugoslavia, the border being established between the two localities, sometimes passing through people's households. The situation was remedied on 3 January 1924, when, following negotiations between Romania and Yugoslavia, Checea Croată was annexed to Checea Română. From 1924 until 1930, the locality is administered by two town halls, i.e. by two mayors and two notaries, one for Checea Română and another for Checea Croată. Between 1921 and 1972, Checea had the status of commune, after which it was incorporated into the commune of Cenei. It regained this status through Law no. 84 of 5 April 2004.

Demographics 

Checea had a population of 1,838 inhabitants at the 2011 census, down 5% from the 2002 census. Most inhabitants are Romanians (52.56%), larger minorities being represented by Roma (29.71%), Hungarians (5.77%), Serbs (2.83%) and Croats (1.63%). For 6.58% of the population, ethnicity is unknown. By religion, most inhabitants are Orthodox (77.97%), but there are also minorities of Roman Catholics (8.11%), Pentecostals (2.67%) and Serbian Orthodox (2.12%). For 6.91% of the population, religious affiliation is unknown.

Notes

References 

Communes in Timiș County
Localities in Romanian Banat